Muhammad Rifad Marasabessy (born 7 July 1999) is an Indonesian professional footballer who plays as a right back for Liga 1 club Borneo Samarinda. He is also a Second Sergeant in the Indonesian army.

Club career

Madura United
In January 2017, Marasabessy signed a two-year contract with Liga 1 club Madura United to commence ahead of the 2017 Liga 1. He made his debut in the Liga 1 on April 16 2017 against Bali United at the Gelora Ratu Pamelingan Stadium, Pamekasan.

TIRA-Persikabo / Persikabo 1973
In February 2019, Marasabessy signed a contract with Liga 1 club TIRA-Persikabo, which is supported by the Indonesian military. He made his debut in the Liga 1, coming as a substitute for Abduh  Lestaluhu on May 18, 2018 against Badak Lampung. On 16 July 2019, Marasabessy scored his first league goal in the 2019 Liga 1 for TIRA-Persikabo in a 5–3 victory over Persija Jakarta at the Pakansari Stadium. He played for two years there, appearing in 30 matches, including in games after the club in 2020 changed its name to Persikabo 1973.

Borneo Samarinda
In 2021, Rifad Marasabessy signed a contract with Liga 1 club Borneo Samarinda. He made his league debut on 4 September 2021 in a match against Persebaya Surabaya at the Wibawa Mukti Stadium, Cikarang.

International career
On 31 May 2017, Marasabessy made his debut for an Indonesian youth team against a Brazil U-20 squad in the 2017 Toulon Tournament in France. He was also one of the players who strengthened the Indonesia U-19 team in the 2018 AFC U-19 Championship.

Marasabessy received a call to join the senior Indonesian national football team in May 2021. He earned his first senior cap in a 25 May 2021 friendly match in Dubai against Afghanistan.

Career statistics

Club

International

Honours

International 
Indonesia U-19
 AFF U-19 Youth Championship third place: 2017, 2018

References

External links
 Rifad Marasabessy at Liga Indonesia
 

1999 births
Living people
Indonesian footballers
Indonesia youth international footballers
Indonesia international footballers 
Madura United F.C. players
Persikabo 1973 players
Borneo F.C. players
Liga 1 (Indonesia) players
People from Tulehu
Sportspeople from Maluku (province)
Association football fullbacks
Association football wingers
21st-century Indonesian people